Taaqat may refer to:

Taaqat (1982 film), Indian film directed by Narendra Bedi
Taaqat (1995 film), Bollywood romantic crime film